Ashish Chattha (born January 6, 2000) is an American soccer player who currently plays for Orange County SC in the USL Championship.

Playing career

Youth, college and amateur
Chattha attended American High School, playing club soccer at Juventus Academy Silicon Valley and Silicon Valley Soccer Club. He also played with the United States Under-15 side in 2015.

In 2018, Chattha attended the University of San Francisco to play college soccer. In two seasons with the Dons, Chattha made 30 appearances, scoring three goals and tallying two assists. After the 2020 season was canceled due to the COVID-19 pandemic, Chattha transferred to the University of California, Irvine, where he competed for a further two years at the college level. With the Anteaters, Chattha made 38 appearances, scoring eight times and adding two assists. In both his junior and senior year he earned All-Big West First Team honors.

In 2018 and 2019, Chattha also competed in the USL League Two with San Francisco City FC, scoring one goal in eight appearances.

Professional
On January 24, 2023, Chattha signed his first professional contract with USL Championship side Orange County SC following a successful trial, including an appearance in a friendly fixture against Hamburger SV. He made his professional debut on March 11, 2023, appearing as a 65th-minute substitute during a 3–1 loss to Louisville City.

Personal
Ashish is of full Indian descent.

References 

2000 births
Living people
American soccer players
American sportspeople of Indian descent
Association football midfielders
Orange County SC players
San Francisco City FC players
San Francisco Dons men's soccer players
Soccer players from California
UC Irvine Anteaters men's soccer players
USL Championship players
USL League Two players